Longhu District is a district of Shantou, Guangdong province, China.  It is the birthplace of the famous Shantou Special Economic Zone.

Administrative divisions 
There are 10 subdistricts in the district:

Shantou Special Economic Zone 
In the in the northwestern part of the Zhuchi Street Subdistrict lies the Longhu Processing Area of the Shantou Special Economic Zone.

Industry 
Towards the south is the Zhuchi Deep-water Port Area of the Shantou Port.  This area contains an international terminal.  Connecting the port to the rest of the mainland are two railways:  the Shugang railway and the Guangmeishan Railway, which has a Passenger Station.

Transportation 
Shantou railway station is located here.
Shantou South railway station is under construction and will be situated here.

References

Shantou
County-level divisions of Guangdong
Island counties of China